Stifftia is a genus of South American trees in the family Asteraceae.

 Species
 Stifftia cayennensis H.Rob. & B.Kahn - French Guiana
 Stifftia chrysantha J.C.Mikan - Bahia, Paraná, Minas Gerais, Rio de Janeiro, São Paulo
 Stifftia fruticosa (Vell.) D.J.N.Hind & Semir - Rio de Janeiro, São Paulo
 Stifftia hatschbachii H.Rob. - Espirito Santo
 Stifftia parviflora (Leandro) D.Don - Espirito Santo, Minas Gerais, Rio de Janeiro, São Paulo
 Stifftia uniflora Ducke - Amazonas, Pará, Amapá

 formerly included
see Gongylolepis, Piptocarpha, Stenopadus, Stomatochaeta 
 Stifftia axillaris - Piptocarpha stifftioides 
 Stifftia benthamiana - Gongylolepis benthamiana  
 Stifftia condensata - Stomatochaeta condensata  
 Stifftia connellii - Stenopadus connellii  
 Stifftia martiana - Gongylolepis martiana

References 

Asteraceae genera
Flora of South America
Stifftioideae